The following is a list of first official international association football matches for each (present or past) member of FIFA, played since the start of 1963. The matches are listed chronologically.

Matches

Liberia and Chad

Congo DR and Mauritania

Niger

Papua New Guinea

Solomon Islands

Somalia

Bermuda

(North) Yemen

South Yemen

Oman

Grenada

Bahrain

Dominican Republic

Eswatini

Botswana

Bahamas

Qatar

Lesotho

Brunei

Cook Islands

Burundi

United Arab Emirates

Nepal

Antigua & Barbuda

Bangladesh

Seychelles

Equatorial Guinea

Guam

Guinea-Bissau

Rwanda

São Tomé & Príncipe

Angola

Mozambique

Cape Verde

Saint Vincent & the Grenadines

Saint Kitts & Nevis

Samoa

Comoros

Tonga

Maldives

Liechtenstein

Bhutan

American Samoa

Faroe Islands

Dominica

Namibia

Saint Lucia

Georgia

San Marino

Cayman Islands and British Virgin Islands

Montserrat

Anguilla

Moldova

Vietnam

Ukraine

Kazakhstan and Turkmenistan

Slovenia

Tajikistan and Uzbekistan

Eritrea

Andorra

Belarus

Kyrgyzstan

Azerbaijan

Armenia

Bosnia & Herzegovina

Macedonia

Belize

U.S. Virgin Islands

Turks & Caicos Islands

Timor-Leste

Serbia

Montenegro

South Sudan

Gibraltar

Kosovo

See also
List of first association football internationals per country: before 1940
List of first association football internationals per country: 1940–1962

Notes
A.Armenia, Azerbaijan and Georgia played in the triangular "Trans-Caucasian Championship" in 1926/1927. Although these matches are included in the ELO ratings for each country, they are not considered "official" matches by the Rec.Sport.Soccer Statistics Foundation.
B.Grenada played four matches between 1934 and 1938 against British Guiana and St. Kitts & Nevis; the official status of these matches is unclear.
C.Saint Vincent and the Grenadines played three matches in 1948 against Trinidad & Tobago; the official status of these matches is unclear.
D.Dominica played four matches between 1932 and 1948 against Martinique; the official status of these matches is unclear.

References

External links
Index of European national team matches up to the end of 1989
The RSSSF Archive – International Country Results
The Association of Football Statisticians: National football team sites
World Football Elo Ratings

1962-present